Tandjilé is one of the 23 regions of Chad, located in the south-west of the country. Its capital is Laï. It corresponds to the former prefecture of the same name.

Geography
The region borders Chari-Baguirmi Region to the north, Moyen-Chari Region and Mandoul Region to the east, Logone Occidental Region and Logone Oriental Region to the south, and Mayo-Kebbi Ouest Region and Mayo-Kebbi Est Region to the west.

Settlements 
Laï is the capital of the region; other major settlements include Baktchoro, Béré, Dafra, Déressia, Dono Manga, Guidari, Kélo and N'Dam.

Demography
As per the 2009 Chadian census the total population was 661,906. The region had 458,240 inhabitants in 1993, of whom 442,876 sedentary (rural, 385,537; urban, 57,339) and 15,364 nomad. The main ethnolinguistic groups are the Besme, Gabri, Goundo, Kabalai, Kim, Kimré, Kwang, Lele, Mango, Marba, Mesme, Mire, Nangtchéré, Ndam, the Sara Ngambay, Somrai, Tobanga and Tumak.

Subdivisions
The region of Tandjilé is divided into two departments:

References

 
Regions of Chad